Oregon Volunteers may refer to:

1st Oregon Volunteer Cavalry Regiment, who served in the U.S. Civil War, 1862–1866
1st Oregon Volunteer Infantry Regiment, who served in the U.S. Civil War, 1864–1867
2nd Oregon Volunteer Infantry Regiment, who served in the Spanish–American War and Philippine–American War, 1898–1899
Oregon Mounted Volunteers, who served in the Rogue River Wars and other conflicts with Native Americans in the American West, active in the 1850s
Oregon Rangers, a short-lived militia, active 1844–1846
Oregon Rifles, a short-lived militia, formed in 1847
Regiment of Mounted Riflemen, later known as the 3rd Cavalry Regiment (United States), incorrectly (as they were regular army), when they marched to the Oregon Territory in 1849